Atmospheric methane is the methane present in Earth's atmosphere. Atmospheric methane concentrations are of interest because it is one of the most potent greenhouse gases in Earth's atmosphere. Atmospheric methane is rising.

Methane's radiative forcing (RF) of climate is direct, and it is the second largest contributor to human-caused climate forcing in the historical period. Methane is a major source of water vapour in the stratosphere through oxidation; and water vapour adds about 15% to methane's radiative forcing effect. Methane increases the amount of ozone O3 in the troposphere and stratosphere. Both water vapour and ozone are GHGs, which in turn adds to climate warming.  

The Earth's atmospheric methane concentration has increased by about 260% since 1750with the overwhelming percentage caused by human activity. Since 1750in terms of massmethane has contributed 3% of GHG emissions but is responsible for approximately 23% of radiative or climate forcing. Global methane concentrations rose from 722 parts per billion (ppb) in pre-industrial times to 1895 ppb by 2021, an increase by a factor of 2.6 and the highest value in at least 800,000 years.

For the first two decades after methane reaches the atmosphere, it has over 84 times the warming power of carbon dioxide;—it traps 84 times more heat per mass unit than carbon dioxide (CO2) and 105 times the effect when accounting for aerosol interactions.

Methane is a short-lived climate pollutant (SLCP) with a lifetime in the atmosphere of twelve years. The Coalition for Climate Action says that mitigation efforts to reduce short-lived climate pollutants, like methane and black carbon would help combat "near-term climate change" and would support Sustainable Development Goals.  

Early in the Earth's history carbon dioxide and methane likely produced a greenhouse effect. The carbon dioxide would have been produced by volcanoes and the methane by early microbes. During this time, Earth's earliest life appeared. These first, ancient bacteria added to the methane concentration by converting hydrogen and carbon dioxide into methane and water. Oxygen did not become a major part of the atmosphere until photosynthetic organisms evolved later in Earth's history. With no oxygen, methane stayed in the atmosphere longer and at higher concentrations than it does today.

Atmospheric methane and climate change

Methane in the Earth's atmosphere is a strong greenhouse gas with a global warming potential (GWP) 84 times greater than CO2 in a 20-year time frame; methane is not as persistent a gas as CO2 (assuming no change in carbon sequestration rates) and tails off to about GWP of 28 for a 100-year time frame. This means that a methane emission is projected to have 28 times the impact on temperature of a carbon dioxide emission of the same mass over the following 100 years assuming no change in the rates of carbon sequestration. Methane has a large effect but for a relatively brief period, having an estimated mean lifetime of 9.1 years in the atmosphere, whereas carbon dioxide is currently given an estimated mean lifetime of over 100 years.

In their May 21,2021 173-page "Global Methane Assessment", the UNEP and CCAP said that  their "understanding of methane's effect on radiative forcing" improved with research by teams led by M. Etminan in 2016, and William Collins in 2018, which resulted in an "upward revision" since the 2014 IPCC Fifth Assessment Report (AR5). The "improved understanding" says that prior estimates of the "overall societal impact of methane emissions" were likely underestimated. Etminan et al. published their new calculations for methane's radiative forcing (RF) in a 2016 Geophysical Research Letters journal article which incorporated the shortwave bands of CH4 in measuring forcing, not used in previous, simpler IPCC methods. Their new RF calculations which significantly revised those cited in earlier, successive IPCC reports for well mixed greenhouse gases (WMGHG) forcings by including the shortwave forcing component due to CH4, resulted in estimates that were approximately 20-25% higher. Collins et al. said that CH4 mitigation that reduces atmospheric methane by the end of the century, could "make a substantial difference to the feasibility of achieving the Paris climate targets," and would provide us with more "allowable carbon emissions to 2100".

About 40% of methane emissions from the fossil fuel industry could be "eliminated at no net cost for firms", according to the International Energy Agency (IEA) by using existing technologies. Forty percent represents 9% of all human methane emissions. The Economist recommended setting methane emissions targets as a reduction in methane emissions would allow for more time to tackle the more challenging carbon emissions".

Global monitoring of atmospheric methane concentrations
Global monitoring of atmospheric methane concentrations began in the 1980s. The Earth's atmospheric methane concentration has increased 260% since preindustrial levels in the mid-18th century, according to the 2022 United Nations Environment Programme's (UNEP) "Global Methane Assessment".

Long term atmospheric measurements of methane by NOAA show that the build up of methane nearly tripled since pre-industrial times since 1750. In 1991 and 1998 there was a sudden growth rate of methane representing a doubling of growth rates in previous years. The June 15, 1991 eruption of Mount Pinatubo, measuring VEI-6was the second-largest terrestrial eruption of the 20th century. According to the 2007 IPCC AR7, unprecedented warm temperatures in 1998the warmest year since surface records were recorded{{emdash}could have could have induced elevated methane emissions, along with an increase in wetland and rice field emissions and the amount of biomass burning.

Data from 2007 suggested methane concentrations were beginning to rise again. This was confirmed in 2010 when a study showed methane levels were on the rise for the 3 years 2007 to 2009. After a decade of near-zero growth in methane levels, "globally averaged atmospheric methane increased by [approximately] 7 nmol/mol per year during 2007 and 2008. During the first half of 2009, globally averaged atmospheric CH4 was [approximately] 7 nmol/mol greater than it was in 2008, suggesting that the increase will continue in 2009." From 2015 to 2019 sharp rises in levels of atmospheric methane have been recorded.

In 2010, methane levels in the Arctic were measured at 1850 nmol/mol which is over twice as high as at any time in the last 400,000 years. According to the IPCC AR5, since 2011 concentrations continued to increase. After 2014, the increase accelerated and by 2017, it reached 1,850 (parts per billion) ppb. The annual average for methane (CH4) was 1866 ppb in 2019 and scientists reported with "very high confidence" that concentrations of CH4 were higher than at any time in at least 800,000 years. The largest annual increase occurred in 2021 with current concentrations reaching a record 260% of pre-industrialwith the overwhelming percentage caused by human activity.

In 2013, IPCC scientists said with "very high confidence", that concentrations of atmospheric methane CH4 "exceeded the pre-industrial levels by about 150% which represented "levels unprecedented in at least the last 800,000 years." The globally averaged concentration of methane in Earth's atmosphere increased by about 150% from 722 ± 25 ppb in 1750 to 1803.1 ± 0.6 ppb in 2011. As of 2016, methane contributed radiative forcing of 0.62 ± 14% Wm−2, or about 20% of the total radiative forcing from all of the long-lived and globally mixed greenhouse gases. According to NOAA, the atmospheric methane concentration has continued to increase since 2011 to an average global concentration of 1895.3 ± 0.6 ppb as of 2021. The May 2021 peak was 1891.6 ppb, while the April 2022 peak was 1909.6 ppb, a 0.9% increase.

 The Global Carbon Project consortium funded by the French BNB Paribas Fondation, produces the Global Methane Budget. Working with over fifty international research institutions and 100 stations globally and update the methane budget every few years.

A 2013 Nature Geoscience article based on data collected between 1980 and 2010 said that at that time the balance between sources and sinks of methane was not fully understood. Scientists were unable to explain why the atmospheric concentration of methane had temporarily ceased to increase. A 2015 World Bank report said that, since 1996 the oil industry gradually cut back on gas flaring. By 2015, gas flaring associated with oil production had been decoupled, resulting in a decrease in flaring of 13% in spite of an increase in production of 20%.

The focus on the role of methane in anthropogenic climate change has become more relevant since the mid-2010s.  In order to mitigate climate change, scientists have been focusing on quantifying the global methane CH4 budget as the concentration of methane continues to increase—it is now second after carbon dioxide in terms of climate forcing. Further understanding of atmospheric methane is necessary in "assessing realistic pathways" towards climate change mitigation. Various research groups give the following values for methane emissions:

Human-caused methane emissions

The AR6 of the IPCC states: "Observed increases in well-mixed greenhouse gas (GHG) concentrations since around 1750 are unequivocally caused by human activities. According to the 2021 IPCC report the overwhelming percentage of the increase in atmospheric methane was caused by human activity Atmospheric methane accounted for 20% of the total radiative forcing (RF) from all of the long-lived and globally mixed greenhouse gases. 

In their 2021 assessment by Climate and Clean Air Coalition (CCAC) and the United Nations Environment Programme (UNEP) over 50%  global methane emissions are caused by human activities in fossil fuels (35%), waste (20%), and agriculture (40%). The oil and gas industry accounts for 23%, and coal mining for 12%. Twenty percent of global global anthropogenic stem from landfills and wastewater. Manure and enteric fermentation represent 32%, and rice cultivation represents 8%.

The most clearly identified rise in atmospheric methane as a result of human activity occurred in the 1700s during the industrial revolution. During the 20th centurymainly because of the use of fossil fuelsconcentration of methane in the atmosphere increased, then stabilized briefly in the 1990s, only to begin to increase again in 2007. After 2014, the increase accelerated and by 2017, reached 1,850 (parts per billion) ppb.

Increases in methane levels due to modern human activities arise from a number of specific sources including industrial activity; from extraction of oil and natural gas from underground reserves; transportation via pipeline of oil and natural gas; and melting permafrost in Arctic regions, due to global warming which is caused by human use of fossil fuels.

The primary component of natural gas is methane, which is emitted to the atmosphere in every stage of natural gas "production, processing, storage, transmission, and distribution".

Natural sources of atmospheric methane 
This graphic depicts the flow of methane from natural and anthropogenic sources into the atmosphere as well as the sinks that capture, convert, or store methane.

Any process that results in the production of methane and its release into the atmosphere can be considered a "source". Two main processes that are responsible for methane production include microorganisms anaerobically converting organic compounds into methane (methanogenesis), which are widespread in aquatic ecosystems, and ruminant animals. Other natural sources include melting permafrost, wetlands, plants, and methane clathrates.

The known sources of methane are predominantly located near the Earth's surface. The 2001 IPCC work group report said that combined with vertical atmospheric motions and methane's relatively long lifetime, methane is considered to be a well-mixed gas. In other words, the concentration of methane is taken to be constant with respect to height within the troposphere. The dominant sink of methane in the troposphere is reaction with hydroxyl radicals that are formed by reaction of singlet oxygen atoms with water vapor. Methane is also present in the stratosphere, where methane's concentration decreases with height.

Methanogenesis 
Most ecological emissions of methane relate directly to methanogens generating methane in warm, moist soils as well as in the digestive tracts of certain animals.
Methanogens are methane producing microorganisms. In order to produce energy, they use an anaerobic process called methanogenesis. This process is used in lieu of aerobic, or with oxygen, processes because methanogens are unable to metabolise in the presence of even small concentrations of oxygen. When acetate is broken down in methanogenesis, the result is the release of methane into the surrounding environment.

Methanogenesis, the scientific term for methane production, occurs primarily in anaerobic conditions because of the lack of availability of other oxidants. In these conditions, microscopic organisms called archaea use acetate and hydrogen to break down essential resources in a process called fermentation.

Acetoclastic methanogenesis – certain archaea cleave acetate produced during anaerobic fermentation to yield methane and carbon dioxide.

H3C-COOH → CH4 + CO2

Hydrogenotrophic methanogenesis – archaea oxidize hydrogen with carbon dioxide to yield methane and water.

4H2 + CO2 → CH4 + 2H2O

While acetoclastic methanogenesis and hydrogenotrophic methanogenesis are the two major source reactions for atmospheric methane, other minor biological methane source reactions also occur. For example, it has been discovered that leaf surface wax exposed to UV radiation in the presence of oxygen is an aerobic source of methane.

Wetlands 

In wetlands, where the rate of methane production is high, plants help methane travel into the atmosphere—acting like inverted lightning rods as they direct the gas up through the soil and into the air. They are also suspected to produce methane themselves, but because the plants would have to use aerobic conditions to produce methane, the process itself is still unidentified, according to a 2014 Biogeochemistry article.

A 1994 article methane emissions from northern wetlands said that since the 1800s, atmospheric methane concentrations increased annually at a rate of about 0.9%.

Animals 
Ruminant animals, particularly cows and sheep, contain bacteria in their gastrointestinal systems that help to break down plant material. Some of these microorganisms use the acetate from the plant material to produce methane, and because these bacteria live in the stomachs and intestines of ruminants, whenever the animal "burps" or defecates, it emits methane as well. Based upon a 2012 study in the Snowy Mountains region, the amount of methane emitted by one cow is equivalent to the amount of methane that around 3.4 hectares of methanotrophic bacteria can consume. research in the Snowy Mountains region of Australia showed 8 tonnes of methane oxidized by methanotrophic bacteria per year on a 1,000 hectare farm. 200 cows on the same farm emitted 5.4 tonnes of methane per year. Hence, one cow emitted 27 kg of methane per year, while the bacteria oxidized 8 kg per hectare. The emissions of one cow were oxidized by 27/8 ≈ 3.4 hectare.

Termites also contain methanogenic microorganisms in their gut. However, some of these microorganisms are so unique that they live nowhere else in the world except in the third gut of termites. These microorganisms also break down biotic components to produce ethanol, as well as methane byproduct. However, unlike ruminants who lose 20% of the energy from the plants they eat, termites only lose 2% of their energy in the process. Thus comparatively, termites do not have to eat as much food as ruminants to obtain the same amount of energy, and give off proportionally less methane.

Plants 
The 2007 IPCC report said that living plants (e.g. forests) have recently been identified as a potentially important source of methane, possibly being responsible for approximately 10 to 30% of atmospheric methane. A 2006 paper calculated emissions of 62–236 Tg a−1, and "this newly identified source may have important implications". However the authors stress "our findings are preliminary with regard to the methane emission strength".

These findings have been called into question in a 2007 paper which found "there is no evidence for substantial aerobic methane emission by terrestrial plants, maximally 0.3% of the previously published values".

While the details of plant methane emissions have yet to be confirmed, plants as a significant methane source would help fill in the gaps of previous global methane budgets as well as explain large plumes of methane that have been observed over the tropics.

Methane gas from methane clathrates 

At high pressures, such as are found on the bottom of the ocean, methane forms a solid clathrate with water, known as methane hydrate. An unknown, but possibly very large quantity of methane is trapped in this form in ocean sediments. 

The release of large volumes of methane gas from such sediments into the atmosphere has been suggested as a possible cause for rapid global warming events in the Earth's distant past, such as the Paleocene–Eocene Thermal Maximum of 55 million years ago, and the Great Dying.

Theories suggest that should global warming cause them to heat up sufficiently, all of this methane gas could again be released into the atmosphere.

Aquatic ecosystems 
Natural and anthropogenic methane emissions from aquatic ecosystems are estimated to contribute about half of total global emissions. Urbanization and eutrophication are expected to lead to increased methane emissions from aquatic ecosystems.

Permafrost 

Permafrost contains almost twice as much carbon as the atmosphere, with ~20 Gt of permafrost-associated methane trapped in methane clathrates. Permafrost thaw results in the formation of thermokarst lakes in ice-rich yedoma deposits. Methane frozen in permafrost is slowly released as permafrost melts. Radiocarbon dating of trace methane in lake bubbles and soil organic carbon concluded that 0.2 to 2.5 Pg of permafrost carbon has been released as methane and carbon dioxide over the last 60 years. The 2020 heat wave may have released significant methane from carbonate deposits in Siberian permafrost.

Methane emissions by the 'permafrost carbon feedback' -- amplification of surface warming due to enhanced radiative forcing by carbon release from permafrost—could contribute an estimated 205 Gt of carbon emissions, leading up to 0.5 °C (0.9 °F) of additional warming by the end of the 21st century. However, recent research based on the carbon isotopic composition of atmospheric methane trapped in bubbles in Antarctic ice suggests that methane emissions from permafrost and methane hydrates were minor during the last deglaciation, suggesting that future permafrost methane emissions may be lower than previously estimated.

Emissions due to oil and gas extraction

A 2005 Wuppertal Institute for Climate, Environment and Energy article identified pipelines that transport natural gas as a source of methane emissions. The article cited the example of Trans-Siberian natural gas pipeline system to western and Central Europe from the Yamburg and Urengoy exist gas fields in Russia with a methane concentration of 97%. In accordance with the IPCC and other natural gas emissions control groups, measurements had to be taken throughout the pipeline to measure methane emissions from technological discharges and leaks at the pipeline fittings and vents. Although the majority of the natural gas leaks were carbon dioxide, a significant amount of methane was also being consistently released from the pipeline as a result of leaks and breakdowns. In 2001, natural gas emissions from the pipeline and natural gas transportation system accounted for 1% of the natural gas produced. Between 2001 and 2005, this was reduced to 0.7%, the 2001 value was significantly less than that of 1996.

A 2012 Climatic Change article and 2014 publication by a team of scientists led by Robert W. Howarth said that there was strong evidence that "shale gas has a larger GHG footprint than conventional gas, considered over any time scale. The GHG footprint of shale gas also exceeds that of oil or coal when considered at decadal time scales." Howarth called for policy changes to regulate methane emissions resulting from hydraulic fracturing and shale gas development.

A 2013 study by a team of researchers led by Scot M. Miller, said that U.S. greenhouse gas reduction policies in 2013 were based on what appeared to be significant underestimates of anthropogenic methane emissions. The article said, that "greenhouse gas emissions from agriculture and fossil fuel extraction and processing"oil and/or natural gaswere "likely a factor of two or greater than cited in existing studies."
By 2001, following a detailed study anthropogenic sources on climate change, IPCC researchers found that there was "stronger evidence that most of the observed warming observed over the last 50 years [was] attributable to human activities." Since the Industrial Revolution humans have had a major impact on concentrations of atmospheric methane, increasing atmospheric concentrations roughly 250%. According to the 2021 IPCC report, 30 - 50% of the current rise in temperatures is caused by emissions of methane, and reducing methane is a fast way of climate change mitigation. An alliance of 107 countries, including Brazil, the EU and the US, have joined the pact known as the Global Methane Pledge, committing to a collective goal of reducing global methane emissions by at least 30% from 2020 levels by 2030.

Ecological conversion
Conversion of forests and natural environments into agricultural plots increases the amount of nitrogen in the soil, which inhibits methane oxidation, weakening the ability of the methanotrophic bacteria in the soil to act as sinks. Additionally, by changing the level of the water table, humans can directly affect the soil's ability to act as a source or sink. The relationship between water table levels and methane emission is explained in the wetlands section of natural sources.

Farm animals
A 2006 UN FAO report reported that livestock generate more greenhouse gases as measured in CO2 equivalents than the entire transportation sector. Livestock accounts for 9% of anthropogenic CO2, 65%t of anthropogenic nitrous oxide and 37% of anthropogenic methane. A senior UN official and co-author of the report, Henning Steinfeld, said "Livestock are one of the most significant contributors to today's most serious environmental problems."

Recent NASA research has confirmed the vital role of enteric fermentation in livestock on global warming. "We understand that other greenhouse gases apart from carbon dioxide are important for climate change today," said Gavin Schmidt, the lead author of the study and a researcher at NASA's Goddard Institute for Space Studies in New York City and Columbia University's Center for Climate Systems Research. Other recent peer reviewed NASA research published in the journal Science has also indicated that the contribution of methane to global warming has been underestimated.

Nicholas Stern, the author of the 2006 Stern Review on climate change has stated "people will need to turn vegetarian if the world is to conquer climate change". President of the National Academy of Sciences Ralph Cicerone (an atmospheric scientist), has indicated the contribution of methane by livestock flatulence and eructation to global warming is a "serious topic". Cicerone states "Methane is the second-most-important greenhouse gas in the atmosphere now. The population of beef cattle and dairy cattle has grown so much that methane from cows now is big. This is not a trivial issue."

Approximately 5% of the methane is released via the flatus, whereas the other 95% is released via eructation. Vaccines are under development to reduce the amount introduced through eructation. Asparagopsis seaweed as a livestock feed additive has reduced methane emissions by more than 80%.

Rice agriculture
Due to a continuously growing world population, rice agriculture has become one of the most significant anthropogenic sources of methane. With warm weather and water-logged soil, rice paddies act like wetlands, but are generated by humans for the purpose of food production. Due to the swamp-like environment of rice fields, these paddies yield 50–100 million metric tons of methane emission each year. This means that rice agriculture is responsible for approximately 15 to 20% of anthropogenic methane emissions.

Landfills
Due to the large collections of organic matter and availability of anaerobic conditions, landfills are the third largest source of atmospheric methane in the United States, accounting for roughly 18.2% of methane emissions globally in 2014. When waste is first added to a landfill, oxygen is abundant and thus undergoes aerobic decomposition; during which time very little methane is produced. However, generally within a year oxygen levels are depleted and anaerobic conditions dominate the landfill allowing methanogens to takeover the decomposition process. These methanogens emit methane into the atmosphere and even after the landfill is closed, the mass amount of decaying matter allows the methanogens to continue producing methane for years.

Waste water treatment
Waste water treatment facilities act to remove organic matter, solids, pathogens, and chemical hazards as a result of human contamination. Methane emission in waste treatment facilities occurs as a result of anaerobic treatments of organic compounds and anaerobic biodegradation of sludge.

Biomass burning
Incomplete burning of both living and dead organic matter results in the emission of methane. While natural wildfires can contribute to methane emissions, the bulk majority of biomass burning occurs as a result of humans – including everything from accidental burnings by civilians to deliberate burnings used to clear out land to biomass burnings occurring as a result of destroying waste.

Oil and natural gas supply chain
Methane is a primary component of natural gas, and thus during the production, processing, storage, transmission, and distribution of natural gas, a significant amount of methane is lost into the atmosphere.

According to the EPA Inventory of U.S Greenhouse Gas Emissions and Sinks: 1990–2015 report, 2015 methane emissions from natural gas and petroleum systems totaled 8.1 Tg per year in the United States. Individually, the EPA estimates that the natural gas system emitted 6.5 Tg per year of methane while petroleum systems emitted 1.6 Tg per year of methane. Methane emissions occur in all sectors of the natural gas industry, from drilling and production, through gathering and processing and transmission, to distribution. These emissions occur through normal operation, routine maintenance, fugitive leaks, system upsets, and venting of equipment. In the oil industry, some underground crude contains natural gas that is entrained in the oil at high reservoir pressures. When oil is removed from the reservoir, associated gas is produced.

However, a review of methane emissions studies reveals that the EPA Inventory of Greenhouse Gas Emissions and Sinks: 1990–2015 report likely significantly underestimated 2015 methane emissions from the oil and natural gas supply chain. The review concluded that in 2015 the oil and natural gas supply chain emitted 13 Tg per year of methane, which is about 60% more than the EPA report for the same time period. The authors write that the most likely cause for the discrepancy is an under sampling by the EPA of so-called "abnormal operating conditions", during which large quantities of methane can be emitted.

Methane slip from gas engines
The use of natural gas and biogas in internal combustion engines for such applications as electricity production, cogeneration and heavy vehicles or marine vessels such as LNG carriers using the boil off gas for propulsion, emits a certain percentage of unburned hydrocarbons of which 85% is methane. The climate issues of using gas to fuel internal combustion engines may offset or even cancel out the advantages of less CO2 and particle emissions is described in this  2016 EU Issue Paper on methane slip from marine engines: "Emissions of unburnt methane (known as the 'methane slip') were around 7 g per kg LNG at higher engine loads, rising to 23–36 g at lower loads. This increase could be due to slow combustion at lower temperatures, which allows small quantities of gas to avoid the combustion process". Road vehicles run more on low load than marine engines causing relatively higher methane slip.

Coal mining
In 2014 NASA researchers reported the discovery of a  methane cloud floating over the Four Corners region of the south-west United States. The discovery was based on data from the European Space Agency's Scanning Imaging Absorption Spectrometer for Atmospheric Chartography instrument from 2002 to 2012.

The report concluded that "the source is likely from established gas, coal, and coalbed methane mining and processing." The region emitted 590,000 metric tons of methane every year between 2002 and 2012—almost 3.5 times the widely used estimates in the European Union's Emissions Database for Global Atmospheric Research. In 2019, the International Energy Agency (IEA) estimated that the methane emissions leaking from the world's coalmines are warming the global climate  at the same rate as the shipping and aviation industries combined.

Removal processes
Any process that consumes methane from the atmosphere can be considered a "sink" of atmospheric methane. The most prominent of these processes occur as a result of methane either being destroyed in the atmosphere or broken down in soil. Humans have yet to act as any significant sink of atmospheric methane.

Reaction with the hydroxyl radical – The major removal mechanism of methane from the atmosphere involves radical chemistry; it reacts with the hydroxyl radical (·OH), initially formed from water vapor broken down by oxygen atoms that come from the cleavage of ozone by ultraviolet radiation. The reaction of methane with hydroxyl in the troposphere or stratosphere creates the methyl radical ·CH3 and water vapor. In addition to being the largest known sink for atmospheric methane, this reaction is one of the most important sources of water vapor in the upper atmosphere. Following the reaction of methane with the hydroxyl radical, two dominant pathways of methane oxidation exist: [A] which leads to a net production of ozone, and [B] which causes no net ozone change. For methane oxidation to take the pathway that leads to net ozone production, nitric oxide (NO) must be available to react with CH3O2·. (Nitric oxide can be formed from nitrogen dioxide by the action of sunlight.) Otherwise, CH3O2· reacts with the hydroperoxyl radical (HO2·), and the oxidation takes the pathway with no net ozone change. Both oxidation pathways lead to a net production of formaldehyde and water vapor.

[A] Net production of O3

CH4 + ·OH → CH3· + H2O

CH3· + O2 + M → CH3O2· + M

CH3O2· + NO → NO2 + CH3O·

CH3O· + O2 → HO2· + HCHO

HO2· + NO → NO2 + ·OH

(2x) NO2 + hv → O(3P) + NO

(2x) O(3P) + O2 + M → O3 + M

[NET: CH4 + 4O2 → HCHO + 2O3 + H2O]

[B] No net change of O3

CH4 + ·OH → CH3· + H2O

CH3· + O2 + M → CH3O2· + M

CH3O2· + HO2· + M → CH3O2H + O2 + M

CH3O2H + hv → CH3O· + ·OH

CH3O· + O2 → HO2· + HCHO

[NET: CH4 + O2 → HCHO + H2O]

M represents a random molecule that facilitates energy transfer during the reaction. Note that for the second reaction, there will be a net loss of radicals in the case where CH3O2H is lost to wet deposition before it can undergo photolysis such that: CH3O2H + H2O → wet deposition. This reaction in the troposphere gives a methane mean lifetime of 9.6 years. Two more minor sinks are soil sinks (160-year mean lifetime) and stratospheric loss by reaction with ·OH, ·Cl and ·O1D in the stratosphere (120-year mean lifetime), giving a net mean lifetime of 8.4 years. Oxidation of methane is the main source of water vapor in the upper stratosphere (beginning at pressure levels around 10 kPa).

The methyl radical formed in the first step can, during normal daytime conditions in the troposphere, react with another hydroxyl radical to form formaldehyde. Though the mechanism is different, the result is the same as in the oxidative pyrolysis which is the first step in the combustion of methane:

 +  →  + 

Formaldehyde can react again with a hydroxyl radical to form carbon dioxide and more water vapor. Sidechains in these reactions may interact with nitrogen compounds that will likely produce ozone, thus supplanting radicals required in the initial reaction.

Natural sinks of atmospheric methane
Most natural sinks occur as a result of chemical reactions in the atmosphere as well as oxidation by methane consuming bacteria in Earth's soils.

Methanotrophs in soils
Soils act as a major sink for atmospheric methane through the methanotrophic bacteria that reside within them. This occurs with two different types of bacteria. "High capacity-low affinity" methanotrophic bacteria grow in areas of high methane concentration, such as waterlogged soils in wetlands and other moist environments. And in areas of low methane concentration, "low capacity-high affinity" methanotrophic bacteria make use of the methane in the atmosphere to grow, rather than relying on methane in their immediate environment.

Forest soils act as good sinks for atmospheric methane because soils are optimally moist for methanotroph activity, and the movement of gases between soil and atmosphere (soil diffusivity) is high. With a lower water table, any methane in the soil has to make it past the methanotrophic bacteria before it can reach the atmosphere.

Wetland soils, however, are often sources of atmospheric methane rather than sinks because the water table is much higher, and the methane can be diffused fairly easily into the air without having to compete with the soil's methanotrophs.

Methanotrophic bacteria in soils – Methanotrophic bacteria that reside within soil use methane as a source of carbon in methane oxidation. Methane oxidation allows methanotrophic bacteria to use methane as a source of energy, reacting methane with oxygen and as a result producing carbon dioxide and water.

 CH4 + 2O2 → CO2 + 2H2O

Troposphere
The most effective sink of atmospheric methane is the hydroxyl radical in the troposphere, or the lowest portion of Earth's atmosphere. As methane rises into the air, it reacts with the hydroxyl radical to create water vapor and carbon dioxide. The mean lifespan of methane in the atmosphere was estimated at 9.6 years as of 2001; however, increasing emissions of methane over time reduce the concentration of the hydroxyl radical in the atmosphere. With less OH˚ to react with, the lifespan of methane could also increase, resulting in greater concentrations of atmospheric methane.

Stratosphere
If it is not destroyed in the troposphere, methane will last approximately 120 years before it is eventually destroyed in Earth's next atmospheric layer: the stratosphere. Destruction in the stratosphere occurs the same way that it does in the troposphere: methane is oxidized to produce carbon dioxide and water vapor.

The reaction of methane and chlorine atoms acts as a primary sink of Cl atoms and is a primary source of hydrochloric acid (HCl) in the stratosphere.

CH4 + Cl → CH3 + HCl

According to a 2006 Journal of Geophysical Research article, the HCl produced in this reaction leads to catalytic ozone destruction in the stratosphere.

A 2017 Earth System Dynamics article said that removal of methane in the lower troposphere may be achieved by chlorine radicals produced by iron salt aerosols, which could be artificially increased without risk to stratospheric ozone.

Natural methane cycles
Emissions of methane into the atmosphere are directly related to temperature and moisture. Thus, the natural environmental changes that occur during seasonal change act as a major control of methane emission. Additionally, even changes in temperature during the day can affect the amount of methane that is produced and consumed.

Its concentration is higher in the Northern Hemisphere since most sources (both natural and human) are located on land and the Northern Hemisphere has more land mass. The concentrations vary seasonally, with, for example, a minimum in the northern tropics during April−May mainly due to removal by the hydroxyl radical. 

For example, plants that produce methane can emit as much as two to four times more methane during the day than during the night. This is directly related to the fact that plants tend to rely on solar energy to enact chemical processes.

Additionally, methane emissions are affected by the level of water sources. Seasonal flooding during the spring and summer naturally increases the amount of methane released into the air.

Release of stored arctic methane due to global warming
Global warming due to fossil fuel emissions has caused Arctic methane release, i.e. the release of methane from seas and soils in permafrost regions of the Arctic.  Although in the long term, this is a natural process, methane release is being exacerbated and accelerated by global warming. This results in negative effects, as methane is itself a powerful greenhouse gas.

The Arctic region is one of the many natural sources of the greenhouse gas methane. Global warming accelerates its release, due to both release of methane from existing stores, and from methanogenesis in rotting biomass. Large quantities of methane are stored in the Arctic in natural gas deposits, permafrost, and as undersea clathrates. Permafrost and clathrates degrade on warming, thus large releases of methane from these sources may arise as a result of global warming. Other sources of methane include submarine taliks, river transport, ice complex retreat, submarine permafrost and decaying gas hydrate deposits.

Atmospheric impacts
The direct radiative greenhouse gas forcing effect has been estimated at 0.5 W/m2.

Methane is a strong GHG with a global warming potential 84 times greater than CO2 in a 20-year time frame. Methane is not as persistent a gas and tails off to about 28 times greater than CO2 for a 100-year time frame.

In addition to the direct heating effect and the normal feedbacks, the methane breaks down to carbon dioxide and water. This water is often above the tropopause where little water usually reaches. Ramanathan (1988) notes that both water and ice clouds, when formed at cold lower stratospheric temperatures, are extremely efficient in enhancing the atmospheric greenhouse effect. He also notes that there is a distinct possibility that large increases in future methane may lead to a surface warming that increases nonlinearly with the methane concentration.

Ozone layer
Methane also affects the degradation of the ozone layer, when methane is transformed into water in the stratosphere. This process is enhanced by global warming, because warmer air holds more water vapor than colder air, so the amount of water vapor in the atmosphere increases as it is warmed by the greenhouse effect. Climate models also indicate that greenhouse gases such as carbon dioxide and methane may enhance the transport of water into the stratosphere; though this is not fully understood.

Methane management techniques

In an effort to mitigate climate change, humans have started to develop alternative methods and medicines.

For example, in order to counteract the amount of methane that ruminants give off, a type of drug called monensin (marketed as rumensin) has been developed. This drug is classified as an ionophore, which is an antibiotic that is naturally produced by a harmless bacteria strain. This drug not only improves feed efficiency but also reduces the amount of methane gas emitted from the animal and its manure.

In addition to medicine, specific manure management techniques have been developed to counteract emissions from livestock manure. Educational resources have begun to be provided for small farms. Management techniques include daily pickup and storage of manure in a completely closed off storage facility that will prevent runoff from making it into bodies of water. The manure can then be kept in storage until it is either reused for fertilizer or taken away and stored in an offsite compost. Nutrient levels of various animal manures are provided for optimal use as compost for gardens and agriculture.

In order to reduce effects on methane oxidation in soil, several steps can be taken. Controlling the usage of nitrogen enhancing fertilizer and reducing the amount of nitrogen pollution into the air can both lower inhibition of methane oxidation. Additionally, using drier growing conditions for crops such as rice and selecting strains of crops that produce more food per unit area can reduce the amount of land with ideal conditions for methanogenesis. Careful selection of areas of land conversion (for example, plowing down forests to create agricultural fields) can also reduce the destruction of major areas of methane oxidation.

To counteract methane emissions from landfills, on March 12, 1996, the EPA (Environmental Protection Agency) added the "Landfill Rule" to the Clean Air Act. This rule requires large landfills that have ever accepted municipal solid waste, have been used as of November 8, 1987, can hold at least 2.5 million metric tons of waste with a volume greater than 2.5 million cubic meters, and/or have nonmethane organic compound (NMOC) emissions of at least 50 metric tons per year to collect and combust emitted landfill gas. This set of requirements excludes 96% of the landfills in the USA. While the direct result of this is landfills reducing emission of non-methane compounds that form smog, the indirect result is reduction of methane emissions as well.

Furthermore, in an attempt to absorb the methane that is already being produced from landfills, experiments in which nutrients were added to the soil to allow methanotrophs to thrive have been conducted. These nutrient supplemented landfills have been shown to act as a small scale methane sink, allowing the abundance of methanotrophs to sponge the methane from the air to use as energy, effectively reducing the landfill's emissions.

To reduce emissions from the natural gas industries, the EPA developed the Natural Gas STAR Program, also known as Gas STAR.

Another program was also developed by the EPA to reduce emissions from coal mining. The Coalbed Methane Outreach Program (CMOP) helps and encourages the mining industry to find ways to use or sell methane that would otherwise be released from the coal mine into the atmosphere.

Methane emissions monitoring 
A portable methane detector has been developed which, mounted in a vehicle, can detect excess levels of methane in the ambient atmosphere and differentiate between natural methane from rotting vegetation or manure and gas leaks. As of 2013 the technology was being deployed by Pacific Gas & Electric.

The Tropospheric Monitoring Instrument aboard the European Space Agency's Sentinel-5P spacecraft launched in October 2017 provides the most detailed methane emissions monitoring which is publicly available. It has a resolution of about 50 square kilometres.

MethaneSat is under development by the Environmental Defense Fund in partnership with researchers at Harvard University, to monitor methane emissions with an improved resolution of 1 kilometer. MethaneSAT is designed to monitor 50 major oil and gas facilities, and could also be used for monitoring of landfills and agriculture. It receives funding from Audacious Project (a collaboration of TED and the Gates Foundation), and is projected to launch as soon as 2020.

Measurement of atmospheric methane

Gas chromatography
Methane is typically measured using gas chromatography. Gas chromatography is a type of chromatography used for separating or analyzing chemical compounds. It is less expensive in general, compared to more advanced methods, but it is more time and labor-intensive.

Spectroscopic method
Spectroscopic methods are the preferred method for atmospheric gas measurements due to its sensitivity and precision. Also, spectroscopic methods are the only way of remotely sensing the atmospheric gases. Infrared spectroscopy covers a large spectrum of techniques, one of which detects gases based on absorption spectroscopy. There are various methods for spectroscopic methods, including Differential optical absorption spectroscopy, Laser-induced fluorescence, and Fourier Transform Infrared.

Cavity ring-down spectroscopy
In 2011, cavity ring-down spectroscopy was the most widely used IR absorption technique of detecting methane. It is a form of laser absorption spectroscopy which determines the mole fraction to the order of parts per trillion.

See also
 Climate change
 Global warming
Permafrost

Notes

References

External links
 

 
 
 
 

 

Methane
Atmosphere
Greenhouse gases